Alex Bellemare is a Canadian skier from Saint-Boniface, Quebec. He has competed in numerous skiing events, such as the Winter X Games. In Aspen in 2015 he took Bronze at the Winter X Games XIX in Slopestyle Skiing. Alex also represented Canada in slopestyle at the 2018 Winter Olympics in PyeongChang.

References

External links
 Freestyle Ski profile
 
 

1983 births
Living people
Canadian male freestyle skiers
Sportspeople from British Columbia
People from the Cowichan Valley Regional District
X Games athletes
Freestyle skiers at the 2018 Winter Olympics
Olympic freestyle skiers of Canada